Bank Branch is a stream in Camden and Laclede counties in the U.S. state of Missouri. It is a tributary of the Niangua River within the Lake of the Ozarks. The stream passes through Ha Ha Tonka State Park just south of the lake.

Bank Branch most likely was named after the Banks family.

See also
List of rivers of Missouri

References

Rivers of Camden County, Missouri
Rivers of Laclede County, Missouri
Rivers of Missouri